The Rev Canon  Robert William Breaden   was Dean of Brechin from 1984 until 2007.

He was born on 7 November 1937, educated at The King's Hospital and ordained in 1962. He was a Curate at Broughty Ferry and then Rector of the  Church of the Holy Rood, Carnoustie from 1965 to 1972. That year he returned to Broughty Ferry and also became a Canon of St Paul's Cathedral, Dundee.

Records relating to his incumbency at St Mary's are held by Archive Services at the University of Dundee, as part of the archives of the Brechin Diocese.

Notes

1937 births
People educated at The King's Hospital
Scottish Episcopalian clergy
Deans of Brechin
Living people
People associated with Dundee